Hang Your Cross is a 2006 EP from hardcore punk band The Hope Conspiracy. This EP was released as a teaser for the upcoming full-length album Death Knows Your Name. Tracks one and two are from the album, while track three is an exclusive track co-written by Kurt Ballou of Converge.

Track listing 
"Hang Your Cross"
"Deadtown Nothing"
"Eurohell"

Sources 
 []

The Hope Conspiracy albums
2006 EPs